RV Wecoma is a research vessel owned by the National Science Foundation and operated by the College of Oceanic & Atmospheric Sciences at Oregon State University (OSU) as a member of the University-National Oceanographic Laboratory System (UNOLS) fleet. It is based in Newport in the U.S. state of Oregon near OSU's Hatfield Marine Science Center.

It has a variety of equipment permanently installed, and optional additional equipment available on request, to measure and analyze navigational data; surface atmospheric conditions; sea surface temperature, salinity, fluorescence; bottom depth; dissolved oxygen titration; solar radiation; GPS time; bioacoustics; and geological sampling. The vessel can support diving operations, radioactive isotope materials, and explosive materials.

Wecoma made her last operational cruise November 2011 and was scheduled to be retired with the interim replacement ship being the former Woods Hole Oceanographic Institution operated R/V Oceanus.

References

External links
 Wecoma Homepage

 

Research vessels of the United States
University-National Oceanographic Laboratory System research vessels
Oregon State University
Newport, Oregon
1976 ships